Nagar Bhaban is a building in Dhaka, Bangladesh that houses the headquarters of Dhaka South City Corporation. The building previously housed the offices of the Dhaka City Corporation prior to the bifurcation of Dhaka as a result of the Local Government (City Corporation) Amendment Act 2011. The building is situated near the University of Dhaka campus and adjacent to the Bangladesh Police headquarters.

Architecture
The building was designed by A. Imamuddin and Lailun Nahar Ekram, and was completed in 1995. it is a 15-storey city hall building containing offices, a bank, meeting rooms, a museum, dining facilities, a prayer hall, the mayor's office, and public terraces. The building has huge columns and arched gateways in the entrance and at the back. The building is very symmetrical. There are two clocks at the top of the building on the north and south face. The building has a finished concrete texture, which gives the building a timeless appearance and a lower maintenance cost. The garden in front helps one to have a better view of the building.

References

Buildings and structures in Dhaka
Government of Dhaka
Government buildings in Bangladesh